BC-LI-0186 is a compound that acts as an inhibitor of the GTPase enzyme leucyl-tRNA synthetase (LRS). This enzyme acts as part of the mTOR complex and acts as a leucine sensor which stimulates mTORC1 in the presence of leucine. BC-LI-0186 blocks the docking site for mTORC1 and thereby prevents the mTOR activation and increased protein synthesis which is usually triggered by branched-chain amino acids such as leucine, yet without inhibiting the separate catalytic activity of LRS. This may have potential applications in the treatment of cancer, and BC-LI-0186 has also been shown to promote muscle regeneration after injury.

References 

Enzyme inhibitors
Pyrazoles
Sulfonamides